KFF Kinostudio is an Albanian women's football club based in Tirana.

Honors 
Albanian National Championship:
Runners–up (1): 2013–14

Albanian Women's Cup:
Runners–up (2): 2011–12, 2015–16

References 

Football clubs in Albania
Association football clubs established in 2010
2010 establishments in Albania
Football clubs in Tirana
Women's football clubs in Albania